Strašice is a municipality and village in Strakonice District in the South Bohemian Region of the Czech Republic. It has about 200 inhabitants.

Administrative parts
The village of Škůdra is an administrative part of Strašice.

References

Villages in Strakonice District